João Batista Nunes de Oliveira (born May 20, 1954 in Cedro de São João, SE), known as Nunes, is a former Brazilian football striker.

He became a football player in 1969, at 14 years old, playing for Flamengo's youth team. Reject by the club in 1974, at 19, he left Rio de Janeiro towards Aracaju (SE) to start his professional career at Confiança. His good performances granted him the 1976 Sergipe State Championship and a transference to Santa Cruz FC in the same year. There he won twice the Pernambuco State Championship (1976, 1978).

In 1977, he had his first cap for Brazil and became a regular in the National Team. Due to an injury, he was not selected to play the 1978 FIFA World Cup which made him miserable. Just after the World Cup, recovered from the injury, he returned to Rio de Janeiro to sign with Fluminense but he stayed there only for a few months before signing with Mexico's CF Monterrey.

Finally, in 1980, he transferred back to Flamengo to take part in a sensational team and make history as one of the most important forwards
in the club's history. Once there he won two Brazilian National Championships (1980, 1982), the 1981 Libertadores Cup and the 1981 Intercontinental Cup.

In 1983 we went on a one-year-loan to Botafogo and in the following year he transferred from Flamengo to Náutico, where he won another Pernambuco State Championship (1985). He would briefly return to Flamengo once again in 1987 and, although not a regular starter, he was a member of the squad that won the Brazilian league again that year.

Nunes also played for Portugal's Boavista, Santos FC, Atlético Mineiro, Volta Redonda FC and El Salvador's Tiburones.

Nunes retired in 1993 after winning his 4th Pernambuco State Championship - the 3rd one playing for Santa Cruz.

References

External links
 
 

1954 births
Living people
Brazilian footballers
Brazil international footballers
Brazilian expatriate footballers
Campeonato Brasileiro Série A players
Primeira Liga players
Clube Atlético Mineiro players
Botafogo de Futebol e Regatas players
CR Flamengo footballers
Fluminense FC players
Santos FC players
Santa Cruz Futebol Clube players
Clube Náutico Capibaribe players
Boavista F.C. players
C.F. Monterrey players
Expatriate footballers in Portugal
Expatriate footballers in Mexico
Expatriate footballers in El Salvador
Association football forwards